Bristol Motor Speedway, formerly known as Bristol International Raceway and Bristol Raceway, is a NASCAR short track venue located in Bristol, Tennessee. Constructed in 1960, it held its first NASCAR race on July 30, 1961. Bristol is among the most popular tracks on the NASCAR schedule because of its distinct features, which include extraordinarily steep banking, an all-concrete surface, two pit roads, Different turn radii, and stadium-like seating. It has also been named one of the loudest NASCAR tracks.

Overview

Bristol Motor Speedway is the fourth-largest sports venue in America and the tenth largest in the world, seating up to 153,000 people. The speeds are far lower than is typical on most NASCAR oval tracks, but they are very fast compared to other short tracks due to the high banking. Those features make for a considerable amount of car contact at the NASCAR races as the initial starting grid of 40 vehicles each in the Cup and Xfinity Series, and 32 in the Truck Series, extends almost halfway around the track, meaning slower qualifiers begin the race almost half a lap down.

The drag strip at this facility has long been nicknamed "Thunder Valley". Both NASCAR Cup Series races held at Bristol are for 500 laps; the spring race (historically a day race; however, the 2006 race ended under nighttime conditions because of Standard Time and the late afternoon start) is sponsored by area grocery chain Food City and considered one of NASCAR's top 10 annual races. The late summer race (the popular night-time race, considered "the toughest ticket in NASCAR" to obtain) has rotated among several sponsors. From 2001 to 2015, Newell Rubbermaid sponsored the race, first under its Sharpie brand (2001–2009) and then its Irwin Tools brand (2010–2015). From 2016 to 2021, Bass Pro Shops became primary sponsor of the summer race, with the National Rifle Association as a secondary sponsor.  In 2022, Bass Pro Shops became the sole entitlement sponsor of Bristol's September NASCAR Playoff Race.

Bristol is a fertile ground for other levels and types of racing; NASCAR Xfinity Series races often draw more than 100,000 spectators, making it one of the best-drawing Xfinity venues, and resulted in Fox televising the race nationally from 2004 to 2006 and ABC doing the same in 2007 and 2008.

In 2004, it was the first Busch Series race of the season televised on broadcast network television, and the race, which had been 150 laps in 1982, 200 laps in 1984, and 250 laps since 1990, was a 300-lap race in 2006.

The Craftsman Truck Series ran a stand-alone race in June from 1995 to 1999 with the NASCAR Autozone Elite Division, Southeast Series. Since 2003, the race has been a midweek (Wednesday) night race as part of the August night race weekend. In 2009, the NASCAR Whelen Modified Tour and the NASCAR Whelen Southern Modified Tour ran a combined race prior to the truck race. In 2017, the race was for the Whelen Modified Tour after NASCAR absorbed the Southern Modified Tour into the Modified Tour prior to the 2017 season.

Angle of banking
The track long advertised its banking as 36 degrees, which at one time made it the most steeply banked track used by NASCAR. However, BMS now lists its banking at 24 to 30 degrees, reflecting the results of the track's most recent resurfacing in 2007.

Even before the resurfacing, there was some dispute as to the accuracy of the measurement. In the 1980s, ESPN often claimed the turns were banked at 35 degrees during television telecast of events at the track. In an interview with Stock Car Racings Larry Cothren, driver Ryan Newman openly disputed the measurement of the banking of Bristol Motor Speedway's turns. Newman's crew measured the banking during a test session to aid with setups, and found that the turns were banked 26 degrees, rather than the advertised 36 degrees. A Camping World Truck Series open test noted the banking had dropped following resurfacing, to 22–27 degrees, in a variable banking configuration.

Pit roads
Another anomaly is that the short overall length means that there are two sets of pits, which also prevents a garage from being built due to limited space. Until 2002, slower starters were relegated to those on the backstretch. That year, the rules were changed to form essentially one long pit road. Thus, Bristol has unique rules about pit road — during caution, drivers who are wanting to pit must enter pit road in turn two, drive all the way down the back stretch through the apron of turns three and four and down the front stretch, exiting pit road in turn one. This rule eliminated the inherent disadvantage of pitting on the back stretch. During green flag pit stops, cars with pit stalls on the back stretch enter the pits in turn two and exit in turn three; those with pits on the front stretch enter in turn four and exit in turn one. Since the new pit rules were instituted, several drivers (most notably Jeff Gordon) have made major mistakes during green flag pit stops by driving through both pit roads when only one is necessary for green flag pit stops.

Track history
Bristol Motor Speedway could very easily have opened in 1961 under a different name. The first proposed site for the speedway was in Piney Flats, Tennessee, but, according to Carl Moore, who built the track along with Larry Carrier and R. G. Pope, the idea met local opposition. So the track that could have been called Piney Flats International Speedway was built  up the road on U.S. Highway 11-E in Bristol. The land upon which Bristol Motor Speedway is built was formerly part of Gray's Dairy, at one point one of the largest dairies in the eastern half of the United States. Larry Carrier and Carl Moore traveled to Charlotte Motor Speedway in 1960 to watch a race and it was then that they decided to build a speedway in northeast Tennessee. However, they wanted a smaller model of CMS, something with a more intimate setting and opted to erect a  facility instead of mirroring the  track in Charlotte.

Work began on what was then called Bristol International Speedway in 1960 and it took approximately one year to finish. Carrier, Moore and Pope scratched many ideas for the track on envelopes and brown paper bags.

Purchase of the land on which BMS now sits, as well as initial construction of the track, cost approximately $600,000. The entire layout for BMS covered  and provided parking for more than 12,000 cars. Seating capacity for the very first NASCAR race at BMS – held on July 30, 1961 – was 18,000. Prior to this race the speedway hosted weekly races. The first driver on the track for practice on July 27, 1961, was Tiny Lund in his Pontiac. The second driver out was David Pearson. Atlanta's Jack Smith won the inaugural event – the Volunteer 500 – at BMS. However, Smith was not in the driver's seat of the Pontiac when the race ended. Smith drove the first 290 laps then had to have Johnny Allen, also of Atlanta, take over as his relief driver. The two shared the $3,225 purse. The total purse for the race was $16,625. Country music star Brenda Lee, who was 17 at the time, sang the national anthem for the first race at BMS. A total of 42 cars started the first race at BMS but only 19 finished.

In the fall of 1969, BMS was reshaped and re-measured. The turns were banked at 36 degrees and it became a  oval.

The speedway was sold after the 1976 season to Lanny Hester and Gary Baker. In the spring of 1978, the track name was changed to Bristol International Raceway. In August that year, the first night race was held on the oval, one that would become one of the most popular and highly anticipated events on the Cup Series calendar.

On April 1, 1982, Lanny Hester sold his half of the speedway to Warner Hodgdon. On July 6, 1983, Hodgdon completed a 100 percent purchase of Bristol Motor Speedway, as well as Nashville Speedway, in a buy-sell agreement with Baker. Hodgdon named Larry Carrier as the track's general manager. On January 11, 1985, Hodgdon filed for bankruptcy. Afterwards, Larry Carrier formally took possession of the speedway and covered all outstanding debts.

For many years, teams were unable to park their transporters inside the infield, nor did the track have any significant garage area. Team transporters were parked in a lot outside of the track. During racing periods, crews and participants were landlocked by the track, and thus, unable to return to the transporters for spare parts, repairs, or rest. In the early 1990s, the infield was reconfigured and completely paved. Teams began parking the transporters in an orchestrated, extremely tight arrangement that takes several hours, and highly skilled drivers, to accomplish. Teams are now able to work out of their transporters in the same fashion as other facilities.

In 1992, the speedway abandoned the asphalt surface that it had used since its inception, switching to the concrete surface it is now famous for.

In 1995, Lights were installed around the track to run races with permanently installed lights instead of the use of trucks with temporary lighting which was used for the Bass Pro Shops NRA Night Race from 1978 to 1994.

On January 22, 1996, Larry Carrier sold the speedway to Bruton Smith's Speedway Motorsports, Inc. (SMI), at a purchase price of $26 million. At the time of the sale, the facility seated 71,000. On May 28 of the same year, the track's name was officially changed to Bristol Motor Speedway'''. By August, 15,000 seats had been added bringing the seating capacity to 86,000.

BMS continued to grow and by April 1997, at 118,000 seats, it had surpassed the University of Tennessee's 102,000 seat Neyland Stadium to become the largest sports arena in Tennessee. The speedway also boasted 22 new skyboxes. For the 1998 Goody's 500, the speedway featured more than 131,000 grandstand seats and 100 skyboxes. Improvements to the speedway since Smith took possession are in excess of $50 million. Under Smith's ownership, all seating sections have been renamed for past race winners and NASCAR champions.

The capacity for the 2000 Food City 500 was 147,000 as the Kulwicki Terrace and Kulwicki Tower were completed. Both were named after NASCAR star Alan Kulwicki, who was the reigning Cup Series champion when he died in a plane crash in 1993 while on his way to the spring race at Bristol, which he won the previous year. As a tribute to retiring star Darrell Waltrip, the entire Turn 3 and 4 sections were renamed in his honor in 2000, including a section of seats in Turn 4 near the start-finish line marked as alcohol free. (Waltrip refused to drive for a team in 1987 because its sponsor was associated with alcoholic beverages.) Sections were also named in honor of the Allison family and David Pearson as part of the renaming of grandstands.

In both 2000 and 2001, the track was temporarily converted to a dirt track to host the World of Outlaws' Channellock Challenge. The conversion involved moving  of red clay onto the track's surface.  of sawdust were laid down first to cover the paved surface. While the races proved to be very popular, the process of installing and removing a temporary surface required 14,000 truckloads of material to be shipped in and out of the track which wore heavily on the roads around the track.

As has been the case since the SMI purchase of BMS, improvements continued in and around the Speedway in 2002. The season saw the addition of a long-awaited infield pedestrian tunnel, allowing access into and out of the infield during on-track activity. Also in 2002, a new building was constructed in the infield to house driver meetings. That same year also witnessed the christening of a new BMS Victory Lane atop the newly constructed building. Kurt Busch won the 2002 Food City 500 on March 24 and became the first Cup winner in the new BMS winner's circle. Additional improvements in 2002 included new scoreboards located on the facing of the suites in Turns 2 and 3. On Monday, August 26, 2002, work began on the most ambitious construction project since SMI's purchase of BMS in 1996. The entire backstretch, including the Speedway's last remaining concrete seats, was demolished. The new backstretch increased the venue's seating capacity to more than 160,000. The new backstretch includes three levels of seating and is topped with 52 luxury skybox suites. These seats are also named for leading NASCAR figures, with Richard Petty, Cale Yarborough and Junior Johnson each having a section of the new seats named for them; Dale Earnhardt was given a section on top in his memory.

A 5,000 seat section of the turn 1 and 2 grandstand, on top of the Alan Kulwicki Grandstand, is now named the Rusty Wallace Tower. Additional improvements included a scoring pylon with a four-sided video screen akin to those in sports arenas hanging from their ceilings; after the 2007 Food City 500, a resurfacing of the entire concrete track along with widening the track  and reshaping the turns with variable banking, which was completed for the 2007 Sharpie 500 in August and their support events in the Busch (now Xfinity Series) and Truck Series.

The 2006 Disney/Pixar animated film Cars used Bristol Motor Speedway as the inspiration for the fictional Motor Speedway of the South, featured in the film's opening scene. Cars director and NASCAR fan John Lasseter made it a 1-mile track, compared with Bristol's half-mile, to make the straightaways little longer for some of the scenes and allow for fans in the infield.

A Guinness World Record was set in August 2008 when the sell-out crowd completed the largest crowd-wave in history.

Another world record was set in August 2009 for the largest karaoke with a sold-out crowd. Later, when the race was red flagged, the crowd performed the wave again, apparently tying the world record.

On Saturday, March 20, 2010, during the NASCAR "Saturday Night Showdown", where retired NASCAR drivers drove in a 35-lap race for charity, a terrifying crash involving Larry Pearson and Charlie Glotzbach ended up in a near-tragedy. The race was put under immediate red flag. Pearson spun out in turn 2, and as his car was sliding down the track, Glotzbach exited turn 2 and rammed into the driver's door of Pearson's car. As Glotzbach climbed out of his car and went to the infield care center, Pearson was unconscious in his car while rescue workers sawed off the roof of the car to get him out. After they got Pearson out, he regained consciousness, as reported by his brothers who talked to him. They also reported that Larry was able to move his arms around. Pearson was air lifted to a nearby hospital. Later, Glotzbach was driven to the same hospital. Before the race started back up, NASCAR legend David Pearson (Larry's father), who was also racing that day, withdrew from the race and went down to the hospital to see his son.

On the week ending August 21, 2010, Kyle Busch became the first driver ever to win races in all three NASCAR national series during a single race meeting. He began the historic week by winning the Truck race on Wednesday. Two days later, he won the Nationwide race following an incident with Brad Keselowski. Late in the race, the two raced for the lead side-by-side before Keselowski bumped Busch during a pass. Busch responded with a harder bump to Keselowski, spinning the latter out. After the race, the two took verbal potshots at one another. Then, during driver introductions immediately before the Cup series race, Keselowski introduced himself and then shouted "Kyle Busch is an ass!" Ultimately, there were no on-track incidents between the two in the Cup race. Busch also exchanged words with David Reutimann after the Cup race.

Busch would repeat this feat at Bristol in 2017, again winning all 3 races during a single race weekend.

In 2016 the scoring pylon was replaced by a large 4-sided display hung by cables over the center of the infield.

BMS has announced a new event called the Short Track U.S. Nationals in May 2017. The event will feature five classes of cars that are featured at local weekly tracks: Super Late Models, Pro (Crate) Late Models, Southern Modifieds, Late Model Stock, Street Stocks, and Compact (4 cylinder) cars. Champion Racing Association will be the lead sanctioning body of the event. The Super Late Model class is co-sanctioned with CRA Super Series, CARS Super Late Model Tour, and Southern Super Series cars.

Every year since 2016, PJ1 TrackBite is applied on the bottom of the track in an attempt to restore racing in the bottom groove that has been lost with changes to the banking in 2007 and 2012.

Bristol was again converted to a dirt track in the spring of 2021. The Bristol Dirt Nationals super late model race was held on March 15–20; the NASCAR Cup Series Food City Dirt Race and NASCAR Truck Series Pinty's Dirt Truck Race will be held on March 29; the World of Outlaws Late Model Series Bristol Bash will be held on April 8–10; and the World of Outlaws Sprint Car Series Bristol Throwdown will be held on April 22–24.World of Outlaws to race Sprints, Late Models at Bristol Motor Speedway in 2021 - Dan Beaver, NBC Sports, 22 December 2020 Both World of Outlaws events were dropped after the 2022 edition, whereas the Bristol Dirt Nationals was rebranded the Bristol Dirt Showcase for the 2023 edition.

Bristol Dragway
In addition to the speedway, there is a  dragstrip that hosts an annual NHRA event each year, the NHRA Thunder Valley Nationals. Prior to its status as an NHRA national event track, the Bristol Dragway was the flagship strip of the rival IHRA organization; the strip's owner Larry Carrier formed the IHRA at the Bristol Dragway in November 1970. The relationship ended when Bruton Smith took over its ownership. The dragstrip has long been nicknamed Thunder Valley due to its location and surrounding scenery.

Bristol Dragway also hosts the Eastern Conference Finals for the Summit Jr. Drag Racing League, the AMRA Thunder Valley Nitro Nationals, the Fall Fling, World Footbrake Challenge, and numerous bracket racing and street car events throughout the year.

Non-motorsports usage
In the fall of 2002, students from Sullivan East High School in Bluff City, Tennessee, attended the skyboxes at the Speedway as temporary school facilities, due to an outbreak of black mold that closed the school for nearly 6 weeks.

In October 2010, Remote Area Medical held a health clinic on the infield of the track, providing free vision, dental and general-medical care to people who do not have medical insurance. The free clinic at Bristol Motor Speedway has become an annual event with Tri-Cities Remote Area Medical continuing the service on the speedway's infield in the Spring of 2012 and again in Spring 2013.

During the holiday season, Bristol Motor Speedway hosts Pinnacle Speedway in Lights, an event featuring christmas light displays along a 5-mile route around the Speedway and its grounds, as well as other activities. The event benefits various local charities.

Bristol Motor Speedway has opened their campgrounds to evacuees of hurricanes, including during Hurricane Irma in 2017, Hurricane Florence in 2018, and Hurricane Dorian in 2019.

In early 2021, Bristol was one of several NASCAR tracks that were used as distribution facilities for the COVID-19 vaccine.

In the summer of 2021, the racetrack played host to a MrBeast YouTube video where 10 contestants from a previous video played a game of tag inside of the speedway where the winner won $500,000.

Football

In 1961, the track hosted a National Football League preseason game between the Philadelphia Eagles and Washington Redskins.

In 2005, track owner Bruton Smith made a public offer of $20 million apiece to the University of Tennessee (UT) and Virginia Tech to schedule a non-conference college football game between the Tennessee Volunteers and Virginia Tech Hokies. Smith suggested that grass could be grown in the infield section of the racetrack. Virginia Tech showed much interest and nearly agreed to the proposal, but UT, on the other hand, showed little or no interest and in fact avoided the offer which made this possibility ultimately fall by the wayside.

On October 14, 2013, after years of attempts to schedule a game, Virginia Tech, UT, and Bristol Motor Speedway announced plans for the game to be held on Saturday, September 10, 2016. Organizers envisioned attendance for the non-conference game, dubbed the Battle at Bristol, to draw 150,000 spectators, which would surpass the current NCAA record for highest single-game attendance of 115,109 then held by Michigan. The game, won 45–24 by the Volunteers, drew an announced crowd of 156,990, breaking the previous record by more than 40,000.

The football field remained in place for one week after the Tennessee–Virginia Tech game. On September 17, the local East Tennessee State Buccaneers played their scheduled Southern Conference home game against the Western Carolina Catamounts at BMS, an event billed as Bucs at Bristol''. This was ETSU's first Southern Conference home game since dropping football after the 2003 season, not reinstating the sport until 2015. The Buccaneers came back from a 21–3 second-quarter deficit to win 34–31.

Races

Current

 NASCAR Cup Series
 Food City Dirt Race (1961–present)
 Bass Pro Shops Night Race (1961–present)
 NASCAR Xfinity Series
 Food City 300 (1982–present)
 NASCAR Camping World Truck Series
 Pinty's Dirt Truck Race (2021–present)
 UNOH 200 (1995–1999, 2003–present)
 ARCA Menards Series East
 Zombie Auto 150 (2012–present)
 NHRA Mello Yello Drag Racing Series
 NHRA Thunder Valley Nationals (1999–present)

Former
 ASA National Tour (1982–1983)
 ARTGO Challenge Series (1987)
 ASA Late Model Series (2007–2008)
 ARCA Racing Series presented by Menards
 Tennessee 500 (1968–1969)
 CARS Rev-Oil Pro Cup Series
 Food City 150 (2004–2008, 2010)
 Frank Kimmel Street Stock Nationals (2008)
 INEX raceCeiver Legends Car Series/Bandoleros
 Battle of Bristol (2007–2008)
 Must See Racing Xtreme Sprint Car Series (2011)
 NASCAR All Pro Series (1982–1983, 1994–1997, 1999–2002)
 NASCAR Goody's Dash Series (1975, 1978–1981, 1986–1987, 1994–2003)
 NASCAR Grand Touring (1968)
 NASCAR Late Model Sportsman National Championship (1972, 1977–1978)
 NASCAR Whelen Modified Tour (2009-2018)
 Red Bull Global Rallycross Championship (2013)
 Red Bull Global Rallycross Championship Lites (2013)
 Rolling Thunder Modifieds (2011)
 UARA-STARS Late Model Series (2004–2005, 2007–2009)
 World of Outlaws Sprint Cars
 Channellock Challenge (2000–2001)

Lap Records
The fastest official race lap records at Bristol Motor Speedway are listed as:

Records
 Overall fastest lap: Brian Gerster, 12.742 s [] October 1, 2011
 NASCAR Cup Series Qualifying: Ryan Blaney, 14.528 s [], April 5, 2019
 NASCAR Cup Series Race (500 laps): Charlie Glotzbach, 2 h 38 min 12 s , July 11, 1971
 NASCAR Xfinity Series Qualifying: Kyle Larson, 14.992 s , April 22, 2017
 NASCAR Xfinity Series Race (300 laps): Kyle Busch, 2:13:59 [], March 25, 2006
 NASCAR Xfinity Series Race (250 laps): Harry Gant, 1 h 26 min 2 s [], April 4, 1992
 NASCAR Truck Series Qualifying: Kyle Busch, 14.827 s [], August 16, 2017
 NASCAR Truck Series Race (200 laps): Travis Kvapil, 1 h 12 min 1 s [], August 20, 2003
 NASCAR Whelen Modified Tour Qualifying: Todd Szegedy, 14.425 s [], 2016
 World of Outlaw Sprint Cars: Sam Hafertepe Jr., 13.326 s [], 2021
 ASA Late Model Series Qualifying: Justin Larson, 15.147 s [], 2008
On March 25, 2007, the first race featuring NASCAR's new car design, the "Car of Tomorrow" (COT) was run at Bristol Motor Speedway. Jeff Gordon won the first ever pole award in a Car of Tomorrow, and Kyle Busch won the race, becoming the first winner in the COT.
On August 25, 2008, at the Sharpie 500, Bristol Motor Speedway set the Guinness World Record for the Largest Card Stunt performed at one time. The stunt was performed by the NASCAR fans who attended the event during the National Anthem. The stunt started with an American Flag that covered the entire stands during the National Anthem and was then followed by another stunt which was an advertisement for a Sprint Nextel Fan Sweepstakes.
Bristol Motor Speedway is a true amphitheater, being completely enclosed by seating, and holds 165,000 people, making it the largest in the world. In comparison, the Roman Colosseum's seating capacity was 50,000 people and the Circus Maximus, a hippodrome, could accommodate an estimated 150,000 spectators.

NASCAR Cup Series records
(As of 4/3/19)

* from minimum 5 starts

References

External links

Bristol Motor Speedway Page on NASCAR.com
GNEXTINC.com: Bristol Motor Speedway Page - Local area information, track specs, mapping, news and more.
Jayski's Bristol Motor Speedway Page - Current and Past Bristol Motor Speedway News
Bristol Motor Speedway Seating Chart

NASCAR tracks
ARCA Menards Series tracks
Motorsport venues in Tennessee
Landmarks in Tennessee
Bristol, Tennessee
East Tennessee
NHRA Division 2 drag racing venues
NASCAR races at Bristol Motor Speedway
Buildings and structures in Sullivan County, Tennessee
Tourist attractions in Sullivan County, Tennessee
Tourist attractions in Bristol, Tennessee
1961 establishments in Tennessee
Sports venues completed in 1961